Karel Nedobitý (13 August 1905 – 24 July 1986) was a Czech long-distance runner. He competed in the 5000 metres at the 1924 Summer Olympics and the 1928 Summer Olympics.

References

External links
 

1905 births
1986 deaths
Athletes (track and field) at the 1924 Summer Olympics
Athletes (track and field) at the 1928 Summer Olympics
Czech male long-distance runners
Olympic athletes of Czechoslovakia